Winsloe South is a former municipality in Prince Edward Island, Canada that held community status between 1986 and 2017. It amalgamated with Brackley on December 15, 2017.

See also 
List of communities in Prince Edward Island

References 

Communities in Queens County, Prince Edward Island
Former community municipalities in Prince Edward Island
Populated places disestablished in 2017